The Isaacs are a bluegrass Southern gospel music group consisting of mother Lily Isaacs (b. September 20, 1947), daughters Becky (b. Aug. 2, 1975) and Sonya Isaacs (b. July 22, 1974) and son Ben Isaacs (b. July 25, 1972), along with John Bowman (husband of Becky Isaacs) as an instrumentalist and songwriter. Joe Isaacs, formerly a singer and banjo player in the group, has left since his 1998 divorce from Lily Isaacs. He now does solo work on a far more localized level.

Former Kingsmen Quartet bass player, lead singer and baritone Tim Surrett was a member of group from 1997 until 2002. Surrett was married to Sonya Isaacs during this time period. Thomas Wywrot was a member from 2008 to 2011. Sonya Isaacs' husband, Jimmy Yeary, took his place.

Currently, the Isaacs consists of Sonya Isaacs Yeary, Lily Isaacs , Becky Isaacs Bowman and Ben Isaacs. On August 10, 2021 they were invited to become members of the Grand Ole Opry.

History
The group's roots go back to 1971, when Joe and Lily Isaacs began a bluegrass band. Lily's parents are Polish Jewish Holocaust survivors. A few years after they were liberated from a concentration camp in Germany in 1945, her parents moved two year old Lily to New York City, where, in 1958, she got a recording contract with Columbia Records and started performing in night clubs. While performing with his Kentucky band at the Gerde's Folk City, Joe met Lily and they were married in 1970. After Joe's brother died in an automobile accident, Joe and Lily became Christians, and the group began to perform only bluegrass gospel music. The group was initially named the Calvary Mountain Boys and later became Sacred Bluegrass before settling on the family name, the Isaacs. The group performed primarily on weekends, part-time, until 1986. As their son and daughters became old enough, they joined the group.

In 1992, the Isaacs moved from Morrow, Ohio, and settled in LaFollette, Tennessee.

Recording 
As the Calvary Mountain Boys and Sacred Bluegrass, the group recorded for Pine Tree and Old Homestead labels. As the Isaacs, they had more success with Morning Star Records and Horizon record labels.

Discography

Albums

Video
2001: Live: Mountain Praise (Horizon)
2001: Pieces of Our Past (Horizon)
2002: Stand Still (Horizon)
2004: The Best of the Isaacs: Favorites from the Homecoming Series (Gaither Music Group)
2008: Live From Norway (Gaither Music Group)

Gaither Homecoming video performances
1996: When All God's Singers Get Home "Carry Me"
1996: Sing Your Blues Away "I Have A Father Who Can"
1997: This is My Story "Look What God Gave Me"
1998: Singin' With The Saints "I'm Gonna Move
1998: All Day Singin' At The Dome "Satisfied" (Sonya)
1998: Atlanta Homecoming "Daddy Sang Bass" (Sonya),"That's All That Matters To Me"
1998: Down By The Tabernacle "The Tabernacle" (Sonya), "The Least I Can Do"
1999: Sweet Sweet Spirit "Reaping In The Spirit"
1999: Mountain Homecoming "Did You Ever Go Sailin'", "Go Rest High On That Mountain" (Sonya)
1999: I'll Meet You On The Mountain "I'll Meet You On The Mountain" (Sonya)
2001: Passin' The Faith Along "I Wanna Be Ready" (Sonya & Becky), "Stand Still"
2002: Let Freedom Ring "The Star-Spangled Banner", "It Is Well (Elisha's Song)"
2002: New Orleans Homecoming "He Understands My Tears"
2003: Going Home "The Prettiest Flowers Will Be Blooming"
2003: Heaven "O Come Angel Band"
2003: Red Rocks Homecoming "When The Rains Come" (Sonya)
2003: Rocky Mountain Homecoming "Sweet Holy Spirit"
2003: Gospel Bluegrass Homecoming Vol. 1 "Is Not This The Land Of Beulah?"
2003: Gospel Bluegrass Homecoming Vol. 2 "Another Soldier Down", "He Ain't Ever Done Me Nothin' But Good"
2004: We Will Stand "When I Survey The Wondrous Cross" (Sonya & Becky), "Hebrew Lullaby", "If That Don't Make You Wanna Go"
2005: Hymns "Wayfaring Stranger"
2005: Israel Homecoming "Halleluyah", "Shalom My Home"
2005: Jerusalem Homecoming "Moses, Take Your Shoes Off" (Sonya), "Walkin' In Jerusalem", "Heroes"
2005: Mark Lowry Goes To Hollywood "Ha Ha Hollywood", "Friend 'Til The End", "Peace Like A River"
2006: Canadian Homecoming "It Is Well With My Soul", "More Than Ever" 
2006: Live From Toronto "Great Is Thy Reward/Orange Blossom Special"
2006: Christmas In South Africa "The Savior Of The World Has Come"
2007: Amazing Grace "I Need Thee Every Hour", "I Surrender All"
2007: Love Can Turn The World "Everything Is Going To Turn Out Right", "Hear My Song, Lord" (Sonya)
2007: South African Homecoming "Umbrella"
2008: Country Bluegrass Homecoming Vol. 1 "There Is Power In The Blood", "Walk On", "I Know Somebody Who Does", "All Prayed Up"
2008: Country Bluegrass Homecoming Vol. 2 "Barbie Bandaids"
2008: Homecoming Picnic "Sally Goodin/Wildwood Flower", "The Sweetest Song I Know" (Becky), "Mama's Teaching Angels How To Sing"
2009: A Campfire Homecoming "I Have Found A Way", "Orange Blossom Special"
2009: Nashville Homecoming "The One I'm Dying For"
2010: Better Day "Mama's Teaching Angels How To Sing"
2010: Count Your Blessings "No Shortage"
2011: Alaskan Homecoming "I've Got Joy"
2011: Majesty "Little Bit Of Heaven", "When I Lift Up My Head", "Healing Stream"
2011: Tent Revival Homecoming "I Believe In A Hill Called Mount Calvary"
2011: The Old Rugged Cross "Consider The Lilies" (Becky & Sonya)

Awards and nominations

Grammy Awards
The Grammy Awards are presented annually by the National Academy of Recording Arts and Sciences of the United States for outstanding achievements in the music industry. The awards were established in 1958. The Isaacs have been nominated twice.

|-
|2016
|Nature's Symphony In 432
| rowspan=3| Best Roots Gospel Album
|
|-
|2018
|Favorites: Revisited By Request 
|
|-
|2022
|Songs for the Times
|

References

External links
 Official website of the Isaacs
 Interview with Lily Isaacs
 The Fishman Isaacs Israel Initiative

American bluegrass music groups
American folk musical groups
Family musical groups
Musical groups from Kentucky
Southern gospel performers
Converts to Christianity from Judaism

People from LaFollette, Tennessee